Sonora is an unincorporated community in Springdale Township in northeastern Washington County, Arkansas, United States. It is located at the intersection of US 412 and Sonora Road, east of Springdale. The upper reaches of Beaver Lake on the White River lie less than two miles to the east and south.

References

Unincorporated communities in Washington County, Arkansas
Unincorporated communities in Arkansas